Wisner Township is one of sixteen townships in Franklin County, Iowa, United States.  As of the 2010 census, its population was 161 and it contained 85 housing units.

History
Wisner Township was created in 1882.

Geography

Cemeteries
The township contains Holland Cemetery and Meservey Cemetery.

Transportation
 Iowa Highway 107

School districts
 Cal Community School District
 West Fork Community School District

Political districts
 Iowa's 4th congressional district
 State House District 54
 State Senate District 27

References

External links
 City-Data.com

Townships in Iowa
Townships in Franklin County, Iowa
1882 establishments in Iowa